Demos:  1993–1996 is a compilation of demos by American sludge metal band Acid Bath.

Track listing
 "Dr. Seuss Is Dead" – 5:39
 "What Color Is Death" – 3:12
 "Scream of the Butterfly" – 6:02
 "God Machine" – 3:59
 "The Mortician's Flame" – 3:39
 "Dope Fiend" – 5:05
 "Finger Paintings of the Insane" – 5:56
 "Jezebel" – 4:53
 "The Bones of Baby Dolls" – 5:15
 "Venus Blue" – 4:31
 "Bleed Me an Ocean" – 6:22
 "Graveflower" – 6:08

Credits
Tracks 1–8 recorded and mixed at Signature Sound in Orlando, Florida – January 1993
Track 9 recorded at Dax's and Norris' house – 1994
Tracks 10–12 recorded and mixed at Festival Studios in Kenner, LA – Summer of 1996
All songs written and recorded by Acid Bath
All songs except track 9 engineered by Keith Falgout
All songs mastered by Nancy Matter at Moonlight Mastering in Burbank, California
Front and back cover art by Jared M. Guillot

References

External links

Dax Riggs albums
Acid Bath albums
Demo albums
2005 compilation albums
Sludge metal compilation albums